Eladio Vallduvi (born 26 April 1950) is a Spanish former sport shooter who competed in the 1972 Summer Olympics, in the 1976 Summer Olympics, in the 1980 Summer Olympics, in the 1984 Summer Olympics, and in the 1988 Summer Olympics.

References

1946 births
Living people
Spanish male sport shooters
Trap and double trap shooters
Olympic shooters of Spain
Shooters at the 1972 Summer Olympics
Shooters at the 1976 Summer Olympics
Shooters at the 1980 Summer Olympics
Shooters at the 1984 Summer Olympics
Shooters at the 1988 Summer Olympics
20th-century Spanish people